This is a list of Telugu-language films produced in the year 1973. Movies (72) in total including dub from other languages

Dubbed films

References

Telugu
1973
1973 in Indian cinema